The Caledon Institute of Social Policy, also Caledon Institute, is a private Canadian think tank focused on social policy. It was founded in 1992. It wound down its day-to-day operations in 2017 and its archive of articles can be found on the Maytree website.

It is primarily funded by the Maytree Foundation.

The Caledon Institute does not have much public visibility and is infrequently in the news; however, it is thought to play a significant role behind the scenes, as is evident by frequent contact with government departments relative to more visible Canadian think tanks.

See also
Think tanks in Canada

References

External links
Official website
Maytree Foundation

Political and economic think tanks based in Canada